Gastón Vedani (born 23 March 1977) is an Ecuadorian sailor. He competed in the Laser event at the 1996 Summer Olympics.

References

External links
 

1977 births
Living people
Ecuadorian male sailors (sport)
Olympic sailors of Ecuador
Sailors at the 1996 Summer Olympics – Laser
Place of birth missing (living people)